Walter Dyett Parsons (26 June 1861 in Southampton, Hampshire, England – 24 December 1939 in East Wellow, Hampshire) was an English cricketer who played two first-class matches for Hampshire County Cricket Club in 1882. He later played for the Straits Settlements against Hong Kong in November 1904.

References

1861 births
1939 deaths
English cricketers
Straits Settlements cricketers
Hampshire cricketers